= Medial Tower =

Coordinates: 32°4′14.0″N 34°47′13.0″E

HaMigdal HaTichon
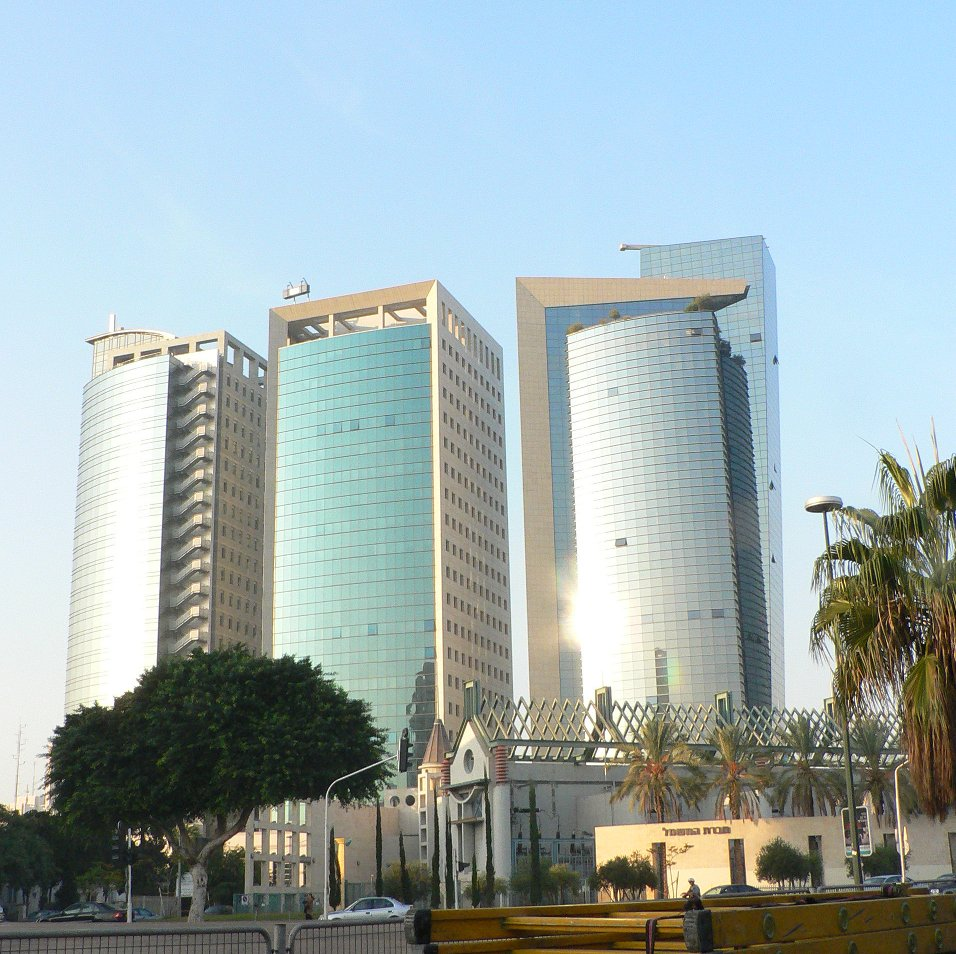
- HaMigdal HaTichon, or the Medial Tower
- Interactive map of the HaMigdal HaTichon area

General information
- Type: Commercial
- Location: 19 HaArba'a Street, Tel Aviv, Israel
- Construction started: 2001
- Completed: 2004

Technical details
- Floor count: 23

Medial Tower (Hebrew: המגדל התיכון, HaMigdal HaTikhon), is a high-rise commercial building in Tel Aviv, Israel. Construction began in 2001, and it was completed in 2004. It is 89.00 metre high. It was designed in the modernist architectural style.
